NGC 1, also occasionally referred to as GC 1, UGC 57, PGC 564 or Holm 2a is an intermediate spiral galaxy of the morphological type Sbc, located approximately 210 to 215 million light-years from the Solar System in the constellation Pegasus. It was discovered on 30 September 1861 by Heinrich d'Arrest.

Observation history 
NGC 1 was first observed by Heinrich d'Arrest in 1860 while testing the 11 inch refractor telescope of the Copenhagen Observatory. He described his discovery as "faint, small, round, between 11th and 14th magnitude stars" (to the north and south). Herman Schultz also observed NGC 1 three times in 1866 and 1868 using a 9.6 inch refractor telescope at Upsala.

Both of the initial observers missed NGC 2, which is much fainter. NGC 1 appears to be quite close to NGC 2, in reality however, the two objects are far apart and unrelated. NGC 2 was first observed as a "companion" of NGC 1 by Lawrence Parsons.

General 

At an estimated 140,000 light-years in diameter, NGC 1 is roughly the same size as our own galaxy, the Milky Way, which is believed to be approximately 160,000 light-years across. Although its apparent magnitude of 13.65 lets the galaxy appear too faint to see it in the sky with the naked eye, its absolute magnitude of -22.08 makes NGC 1 two to three times more luminous than our home galaxy. The galaxy is 4.0 Mly away from the 80,000 light-year wide galaxy UGC 69, its nearest major neighbor.

NGC 1 has a visual size of 1.6' × 1.2'. Being classified as a SABbc class galaxy using the Hubble sequence and the De Vaucouleurs system as an extension, NGC 1 is a spiral galaxy with the presence of a weak nuclear bar and loosely wound arms.  Although the central galaxy is only about 90,000 light-years across, a large, diffuse arm extends eastwards from it, possibly from a past merger.

Based on its redshift of approximately 0.015177 and thus recessional velocity of 4450 km/s, the distance of the galaxy from the Solar System can be calculated using Hubble's Law. Using current observation data, this places the galaxy at approximately 210 to 215 million light-years from Earth, which is in good agreement with redshift-independent distance estimates of 175 to 245 million light years. An opposing measurement of the galaxy's recessional velocity of 2215 km/s would place the galaxy only about 100 million light-years away. However, this is regarded unlikely by most astronomers and believed to be a misattributed value for a different galaxy.

Listing in astronomical catalogues 
After being logged as the first object in the General Catalogue, the galaxy is also the first object to be listed in the catalogue's successor, the New General Catalogue. Since then, the coordinates have shifted, and this object no longer has the lowest right ascension of all the NGC objects.

NGC 1 is also listed in the Uppsala General Catalogue (UGC 57) and in the Principal Galaxies Catalogue (PGC 564).

See also
Pegasus (constellation)
List of NGC objects (1–1000)
Spiral galaxy

References

External links

 
 SEDS

Galaxies discovered in 1861
Unbarred spiral galaxies
Pegasus (constellation)
0001
00057
00564
18610930
Discoveries by Heinrich Louis d'Arrest